Joseph Quinn (born 1993 or 1994) is a British actor. He is best known for his role as Eddie Munson in the fourth season of the Netflix series Stranger Things (2022).

Quinn gained prominence through his roles in the BBC One series Dickensian (2016) and Howards End (2017), and the Sky Atlantic series Catherine the Great (2019). He also had supporting roles in Les Misérables (2018) and Strike (2020), also on BBC One. He was named a 2018 Screen International Star of Tomorrow.

Early life 
Quinn was born and raised in South London. He attended Emanuel, a private school, from 2007 to 2012; he was able to attend on a bursary from their drama scholar program. He subsequently went to drama school at the London Academy of Music and Dramatic Art (LAMDA), graduating in 2015.

Career 
After graduating from LAMDA, Quinn was cast in the BBC One series Dickensian as main character Arthur Havisham. He starred in the 2017 four-part series Howards End as Leonard Bast, a young bank clerk, opposite Hayley Atwell. That same year, he starred in the short film KIN, and appeared in a season 7 episode of the HBO series Game of Thrones as Koner, a Stark soldier.

Quinn is also known for his work in theatre, appearing on the London stage at the National Theatre and Off West End. He was awarded Best actor in a Studio Production at the 2017 Manchester Theatre Awards for his performance in Wish List.

In 2018, Quinn played Enjolras in the BBC One adaptation of Les Misérables and made his feature film debut in Overlord. The following year, he starred alongside Molly Windsor in the thriller film Make Up and portrayed Tsarevich Pavel in the Sky Atlantic miniseries Catherine the Great. He voiced Will Ladislaw in a BBC Radio 4 adaptation of Middlemarch. In 2020, he appeared in the BBC One series Strike and the Mangrove installment of Steve McQueen's television anthology Small Axe.

In 2022, Quinn gained prominence internationally through his role as Eddie Munson in the fourth season of Stranger Things. He was cast in the role in 2019, with filming for the season taking place in 2021. Quinn was nominated for a Saturn Award for Best Supporting Actor in a Streaming Series for his role. In August 2022, Quinn signed with CAA.

Quinn narrated the trailer for a reboot of the Lords of the Fallen video game. He became the official face for the Gris Dior fragrance in October 2022. At the 2022 Newport Beach Film Festival Honors, Quinn appeared on the Variety list of 10 Actors to Watch. In November 2022, Quinn was one of British GQ's Men of the Year Honourees.

Filmography

Film

Television

Stage

References

External links
 

Living people
1990s births
21st-century English male actors
Alumni of the London Academy of Music and Dramatic Art
English male film actors
English male stage actors
English male television actors
English people of Irish descent
Male actors from London
People educated at Emanuel School
People from the London Borough of Wandsworth
Year of birth uncertain
1994 births